Edward Arthur Argent (6 February 1898 – 20 July 1968) was an English cricketer who played two first-class matches, both for Worcestershire in the space of a few days in 1928. He had very little success, taking no wickets from a total of 13 overs and making scores of 3, 0 and 19 with the bat.

Argent was born in Wandsworth, London; he died aged 70 in Horsham, Sussex.

External links
 
 Statistical summary from CricketArchive

1898 births
1968 deaths
English cricketers
Worcestershire cricketers
People from Wandsworth